Saraswatichandra is an Indian soap opera produced by Sanjay Leela Bhansali, written by Saba Mumtaz, Shruti Vaidys, Utkarsh Naithani, Ved Raj and Abhijit Sinha, and is based on Govardhanram Tripathi's 1887-1901 four volume novel of the same name. It aired on Star Plus from 25 February 2013 to 20 September 2014.

Due to issues arising from the original production company, in August 2013, Saraswatichandra switched its production house to Sphere Origins.

Plot 
Young aristocrat Saraswatichandra Laxminandan Vyas, a.k.a. Saras, who lives in Dubai is introverted due to his mother's suicide and rejects an arranged marriage by his father with his friend Vidyachatur Desai's daughter Kumud, informing her by letter. She challenges him to inform her father and so Saras travels to her village  named Ratnanagri in Ahmedabad district, Gujarat, India, gains familiarity with her family and gradually falls in love with her. On his return to Dubai, Saras finds a letter from his mother Saraswati, explaining that she committed suicide due to his father  having an affair with Ghuman. That letter was written by his step mother Ghuman. Saras disowns his father and decides not to marry Kumud because he cannot support her without his family's wealth.

To save her family's reputation, Kumud rushes into a marriage with Pramad, the son of a politician. Saras realizes his mistake and tries to stop the wedding, but is beaten up by thugs. Kumud finds that her husband is an abusive alcoholic but resolves to change him. Pramad's sister Alak finds Saras and brings him to the family home to recover. Saras vows to change Pramad's ways. Pramad's father also wants Pramad to change, and hires Saras as his secretary which makes Pramad jealous.

Pramad pretends to be a changed man, but tries to kill Kumud with the help of maid Kalika. Saras rescues Kumud, who separates from Pramad and returns to her family home. However, Kalika enters the household by marrying Kumud's cousin Yash. Pramad attempts to abduct Kumud but his goons take her sister Kusum. Saras saves Kusum, who develops feelings for him but agrees to marry another. Pramad sends evidence of Kusum's kidnapping to the groom's family, who call off the wedding. To save the family's reputation, Kumud convinces her family to allow Saras to marry Kusum. Saras agrees, but plots to have Kusum married to his younger stepbrother Danny, who loves her. Kusum gradually recognizes Danny's love and returns his feelings. Pramad travels abroad for medical treatment, abandoning Kumud and facilitating her divorce. Kumud marries Saras, who reconciles with his father Laxminandan. Laxminandan meets with an accident with car of a man, Kabir.

After the wedding, Kabir helps the families when Laxminandan falls into a coma. Kabir is secretly working for Saras's stepmother Ghuman to create problems between Danny, Kusum and Saras in order to gain Laxminandan's wealth. Actually he is pretending to help Ghuman to take revenge from her. Kumud finds out Kabir's truth. Kumud learns about Ghuman's elder sister Menaka and Ghuman's secret. Kumud goes to that place where Ghuman used to work as a dancer before marrying Laxminandan. Kumud is kidnapped and again rescued by Saras. Ghuman's friend Sunanda reveals to Saras and Kumud that Ghuman had paid a governess to kill a baby 21 years earlier. Vidyachatur's younger sister Dugba who was Saraswati's friend tells Saras and Kumud after that Saraswati was pregnant for a second time but she suffered a miscarriage and Laxminandan blamed her for the miscarriage, that's why she killed herself. Then she searches in that hospital in which Saraswati was admitted at the time of her delivery. She learns that her baby was alive and was swapped with a stillborn baby and Dugba tells this to Saras and Kumud. They doubt Ghuman. Saras and Kumud confront Menaka for her and Ghuman's secret and Menaka reveals Kabir's identity as Saras's younger brother, thought to have died in infancy, and that he is actually seeking vengeance on Ghuman for separating him from his family. He was raised by Menaka because Menaka wanted to take revenge from Ghuman and to take her property. Ghuman learns of this and has Kabir kidnapped in London, with Saras and Kumud going to save him. Meanwhile, Ghuman uses Kalika to try to separate Danny and Kusum. Kalika reveals the truth and is divorced and disowned by Yash. Ghuman tries to kill Saras, Kumud and Kabir, but they are saved. Laxminandan awakens and disowns Ghuman, who is arrested. Saras and Kabir both reconcile with their father.

Saras and Kumud move to Mumbai for a business project for six months. Their landlord Prashant Tyagi becomes obsessed with Kumud, who is a look-alike of his girlfriend he murdered. The landlord kidnaps them both and tries to murder Saras, but they find evidence and have him arrested.

During Kabir's wedding to Kusum's friend Anushka, a young man attempts to kill Saras and Kumud, extorting Anushka's cooperation because he had kidnapped her younger brother Avinash and blackmailed her. Saras is hospitalized saving Kumud and Kabir breaks off the engagement. Kabir and Danny save Avinash, and Kabir forgives Anushka. Ghuman is revealed to be behind the plot.

Ghuman feigns mental illness and is transferred from jail to a mental asylum, where she finds her rival, Saras's mother Saraswati who is alive and suffering amnesia. Ghuman informs Kumud but still tries to take revenge. Kumud helps Saraswati regain her memory and mental health, and the family is reunited. Ghuman is returned to jail. Saras and Kumud have their first child.

Cast

Main
Jennifer Winget as Kumud Sundari Desai Vyas: Guniyal and Vidyachatur's daughter; Yash, Kusum, and Kumari's sister; Pramadan's former wife; Saras' wife
Gautam Rode as Saraswatichandra "Saras" Vyas: Saraswati and Laxminandan's son; Danny and Kabir's brother; Kumud's husband

Recurring
 Varun Kapoor as Danny Vyas: Saras and Kabir's younger half-brother; Laxminandan and Gumaan's son, Kusum's husband (2013-2014)
 Shiny Doshi as Kusum Desai Vyas: Kumud and Yash's younger sister; Danny's wife (2013-2014)
 Ashish Kapoor as Kabir Vyas: Saras's younger and Danny's elder half-brother, Anushka's fiance, Laxminandan and Saraswati's younger son (2014)
 Srishty Rode as Anushka: Kabir's fiance (2014)
 Anshul Trivedi as Pramadan Dharmadhikari: Kumud's ex-husband (2013)
 Chetan Pandit as Laxminandan Vyas: Saras, Kabir and Danny's father, Vidyachatur's best friend, Saraswati and Gumaan's husband (2013–14)
 Monica Bedi as Ghuman Kaur: Saras and Kabir's step-mother, Danny's mother, Laxminandan's second wife (2013–14)
 Yatin Karyekar/Aliraza Namdar as Vidyachatur Desai: Kumud and Kusum's father, Laxminandan's best friend, Guniyal's husband (2013–14)
 Alpana Buch as Guniyal Devi Desai: Kumud and Kusum's mother, Vidyachatur's wife (2013–14)
 Ragini Shah as Dugba: Vidyachtur's younger sister, Kumari's mother, Sahastrar's wife, Saraswati's best friend (2013–14)
 Vinita Mahesh as Kumari: Dugba and Sahastrar's daughter
 Mehul Kajaria as Gyanchatur Desai: Vidyachatur's younger brother (2013–14)
 Mansi Jain as Chandrika Kaur Desai: Gyanchatur's wife (2013–14)
 Surya Kanth / Winy Tripathi as Yash Desai: Vidyachatur and Gyanchatur's elder brother's son, Vidyachatur and Gyanchatur's nephew, Kalika's ex-husband (2013–14)
 Soni Singh as Kalika Desai: Yash's ex-wife (2013–14)
 Sonia Shah as Menaka: Ghuman's elder sister
 Sai Ballal as Buddhi Dhan Dharmadhikari: Pramad and Alak's father, Saubhagyawati Devi's husband (2013)
 Pratichi Mishra as Saubhagyavati Devi Dharmadhikari: Pramad and Alak's mother, Buddhidhan's wife (2013)
 Vahbbiz Dorabjee as Alak Kishori Dharmadhikari: Pramad's sister, Indresh's wife (2013)
 Vijay Badlani as Indresh: Alak's husband
 Shahrukh Sadri as Murakh Das: Kalika's father, Dharmadhikari house's servant
 Maleeka R Ghai as Saraswati Vyas: Saras and Kabir's mother, Danny's stepmother, Laxminandan's first wife (2014)
 Rahulram Manchanda as Prashant: Saras and Kumud's landlord in Mumbai
 Mithil Jain as Sub-Inspector Umesh Solanki: Kumari's ex-lover
 Smita Shetty as Sunder Baa: Vidyachatur and Gyanchatur's elder brother wife, Yash's mother
 Varun Sharma as Mohan: Kusum's ex-fiancé
 Shivani Gosain as Sunanda: Ghuman's friend-turned-rival
 Menaka Lalwani as Aarti
 Manasi Parekh as Karuna

Production
The production of the series began in May 2012.

The grand set of the series and the production cost ₹5.5 crore (55 million rupees). Initial scenes were shot in Dubai and Rajkot. In August 2013, Sphere Origins took over the production of the series from Sanjay Leela Bhansali Films Pvt Ltd, after which, in January 2014, the storyline deviated from the novel as Saras and Kumud marry.

Reception

Critics
Hindustan Times said, "Style is good but substance is better."

Ratings
The series garnered an average rating of 2.5 TVR in its first episode and 2.1 TVR in the premiere week. However, the following weeks it improved.

Awards and nominations

References

External links
Official Website 

 (official Slovak page)

2013 Indian television series debuts
2014 Indian television series endings
DD National original programming
Indian television soap operas
StarPlus original programming
Television shows based on Indian novels
Television shows set in Gujarat
Hindi-language television shows